Imre Salusinszky (born 1955) is an Australian journalist, political adviser and English literature academic who is currently media adviser to former Australian Government Minister for Communications, Urban Infrastructure, Cities and the Arts, Paul Fletcher.

Background and career
Born in Budapest, Salusinszky and his family came to Australia as refugees following the 1956 Hungarian uprising. He was educated at Melbourne High School, the University of Melbourne, and the University of Oxford. He lectured at Yale University and at the University of Melbourne, prior to taking up tenure as an associate professor in the English Department at the University of Newcastle. He started writing for The Australian Financial Review in 1994, and featured for several years on the Coodabeen Champions, on ABC Radio, as well as on Life Matters.

He was an editorial advisor for Quadrant, a political reporter and columnist for The Australian, and wrote for the Sydney Morning Herald and Sun-Herald. In 2006, he was appointed Chairman of the Literature Board of the Australia Council for a three-year term. Penguin publishing director Bob Sessions praised his appointment: "I think it's terrific," he said. "Fresh blood with a good knowledge of the industry." However, former Australia Council Chair, Hilary McPhee, criticised it as right-wing political bias. Salusinszky served as media adviser for former Premier of New South Wales, Mike Baird, from 2013 and 2017.

In 2019 Salusinsky published, The Hilton Bombing: Evan Pederick and the Ananda Marga, which denied the existence of evidence of a conspiracy  and provided evidence that Pederick was responsible for the Sydney Hilton Bombing. It was shortlisted for the 2020 Nib Literary Award.

Bibliography

References 

1955 births
Academic staff of the University of Newcastle (Australia)
Australian columnists
Living people
University of Melbourne alumni
Alumni of the University of Oxford
Quadrant (magazine) people